Staffordshire/Warwickshire 2 was a tier 11 English Rugby Union league with teams from Staffordshire and Warwickshire taking part.  Promoted teams moved up to Staffordshire/Warwickshire 1 and relegated teams dropped to Staffordshire/Warwickshire 3.  Restructuring of the Staffordshire/Warwickshire leagues at the end of the 1995–96 season meant that the division was cancelled and all teams transferred into Staffordshire/Warwickshire 1.

Original teams

When this division was introduced in 1992 as part of a merger of the Staffordshire and Warwickshire leagues, it contained the following teams:

Berkswell & Balsall - transferred from Warwickshire 2 (3rd)
Cannock - transferred from Staffordshire 1 (8th)
Coventrians - transferred from Warwickshire 2 (runners up)
Earlsdon - transferred from Warwickshire 2 (5th)
Old Oaks - transferred from Staffordshire 2 (runners up)
Pinley - transferred from Warwickshire 2 (4th)
Rubery Owen - transferred from Staffordshire 1 (7th)
Rugby St Andrews - transferred from Warwickshire 2 (6th)
Rugeley - transferred from Staffordshire 2 (champions)
Silhillians - transferred from Warwickshire 1 (11th)
Southham - transferred from Warwickshire 2 (champions)
Spartans - transferred from Warwickshire 1 (9th)
Stoke Old Boys - transferred from Warwickshire 1 (10th)

Staffordshire/Warwickshire 2 honours

Staffordshire/Warwickshire 2 (1992–1993)

The original Staffordshire/Warwickshire 2 was a tier 10 league.  Promotion was to Staffordshire/Warwickshire 1 and relegation to Staffordshire/Warwickshire 3.

Staffordshire/Warwickshire 2 (1993–1996)

The top six teams from Midlands 1 and the top six from North 1 were combined to create National 5 North, meaning that Staffordshire/Warwickshire 2 dropped to become a tier 11 league.  Promotion continued to Staffordshire/Warwickshire 1 and relegation to Staffordshire/Warwickshire 3.  The division was cancelled at the end of the 1995–96 season and all teams transferred up into Staffordshire/Warwickshire 1.

Number of league titles

Atherstone (1)
Berkswell & Balsall (1)
Silhillians (1)
Stoke Old Boys (1)

See also
Staffordshire/Warwickshire 1
Staffordshire/Warwickshire 3
Staffordshire/Warwickshire 4
Midlands RFU
Staffordshire RU
Warwickshire RFU
English rugby union system
Rugby union in England

Notes

References

Defunct rugby union leagues in England
Rugby union in Staffordshire
Rugby union in Warwickshire
Sports leagues established in 1992
Sports leagues disestablished in 1996